Penhas da Saúde is a village in the municipality of Covilhã, Portugal. This mountain village sits right in the heart of Serra da Estrela, nestled within the scenic mountain range, at an altitude of 1,500 metres. It is primarily a winter resort.

Winter resort
The tourism facilities in Penhas da Saúde consists of the Serra da Estrela Hotel, a youth hostel and the Mountain Chalets, 10 minutes away from the Vodafone Ski Resort. Slightly below the village, overlooking Cova da Beira, sits the typical Estalagem Varanda dos Carqueijais.

The Vodafone Ski Resort is located at Torre (highest point in mainland Portugal), in Seia, right in the centre of the nature reserve, at an altitude of 2,000 metres. Covered in snow from December to April, thanks to an artificial snow-producing process, the ski resort houses the support infrastructures for the practice of winter sports and provides facilities such as mechanical lifts and a pass identification system for the lifts. That ski resort is a destination in Portugal for winter sports and entertainment.

Activities include mushing (dog sledding), sleigh rides and snow motorcycles. A range of equipment, such as alpine skis and snowboards can be rented locally.

Geography

Climate

Penhas da Saúde (meaning Cliffs of the Health in English) has a cool-summer Mediterranean climate (Csb, according to the Köppen climate classification), with oceanic (Cfb) and continental (Dsb/Dfb) influences. There is a short dry season in summer, and high precipitation in the remaining of the year.

Summers are pleasant and winters are chilly to cold, with snowfalls, sometimes with very significant accumulation.

References

Sources 
  Câmara Municipal da Covilhã (Covilhã City Hall)

Resorts in Portugal
Villages in Portugal
Populated places in Castelo Branco District
Serra da Estrela